Greatest Hits Collection, Vol. 1 is the fifth album, and the first compilation album released by country music singer Trace Adkins. It was released on July 8, 2003 and features the greatest hits from his first studio albums (1996's Dreamin' Out Loud, 1997's Big Time, 1999's More..., and 2001's Chrome). Also included on this compilation are the previously unreleased tracks "Then They Do" and "Welcome to Hell". The former was released as a single in 2003, reaching the Top 10 on the Billboard Hot Country Songs charts.

Track listing

Chart performance

Weekly charts

Year-end charts

Singles

Certifications

References

2003 greatest hits albums
Trace Adkins albums
Capitol Records compilation albums